Edward Conway may refer to:
 Edward Conway, 1st Viscount Conway (1564–1631), English soldier and statesman
 Edward Conway, 2nd Viscount Conway (died 1655), English peer
 Edward Conway, 1st Earl of Conway (c. 1623–1683), English peer and politician
 E. J. Conway (Edward Joseph Conway) (1894–1965), Irish biochemist
 Marshall Edward Conway, known as Marshall "Eddie" Conway (1946-), Black Panther Party member